UpFront Records is a record label owned and founded by DeVyne Stephens. Stephens began his career in the early 1990s with Devyne featuring 90 Miles an Hour. "I was one of the first artists L.A. [Reid] and Babyface signed to LaFace Records," he says. But the group broke up before it could release an album.

Undaunted, Stephens found his niche as a choreographer and imaging expert for LaFace Records. He worked with everyone from Pebbles, Toni Braxton and Pink to TLC, Usher and Boyz II Men. He says that people in Atlanta have their own individual style. "Being I'm a native from Atlanta, I cultivate that style and put it on different artists," he says.

Stephens discovered Senegalese R&B singer Akon, who just moved to Atlanta from New Jersey. He signed Akon to his own UpFront Records and secured a distribution deal with SRC/Universal. "I always believed that Akon was special," he says. Akon went on to sell over a million copies of his 2004 debut, Trouble, and score hit singles like "Locked Up" and "Lonely".

UpFront Records' roster includes Akon, R&B quartet Red Dirt, and rap group FA (Free Agents). He says there isn't much difference between his former job at LaFace and his current duties as a record executive. He teaches his artists, "The first thing people look for is individuality. You gotta[sic] have that in the music industry. Style is definitely important."

See also
 List of record labels

External links

American record labels
Record labels established in 2005
Labels distributed by Warner Music Group
Contemporary R&B record labels
Hip hop record labels